Adrian Blair (born 21 December 1943) is an Indigenous Australian boxer who competed at the 1964 Tokyo Olympics in the lightweight division. He also competed at the 1962 British Empire and Commonwealth Games.

References

External links
 
 
 
 
 

1943 births
Living people
Australian male boxers
Indigenous Australian boxers
Indigenous Australian Olympians
Olympic boxers of Australia
Boxers at the 1964 Summer Olympics
Lightweight boxers
Boxers at the 1962 British Empire and Commonwealth Games
Commonwealth Games competitors for Australia